Çamaltı is a village in the Bartın District, Bartın Province, Turkey. In 2021, its population is 325.

References

Villages in Bartın District